Albert Wilson may refer to:

Al Wilson (pilot) (Albert Pete Wilson, 1895–1932), American film actor, producer and stunt pilot
Albert Wilson (American football) (born 1992), American football player
Albert Wilson (botanist) (1902–1996), American botanist and gardener
Albert Wilson (footballer) (1915–1998), English footballer
Albert Wilson (politician) (1878–?), Australian politician
Albert E. Wilson (c. 1813–1861), American pioneer and merchant in Oregon Country
Albert George Wilson (1918–2012), American astronomer who worked at Palomar Observatory

See also
Al Wilson (disambiguation)
Bert Wilson (disambiguation)